The H. P. Thomas House is an historic house located at 322 Somerset Avenue in Taunton, Massachusetts.

Description and history 
The -story, wood-framed house was built in about 1887, and is a fine local example of Queen Anne styling. The house has asymmetrical massing, with large gable-roof sections projecting from an otherwise hipped roof. The porch has fine decorative balustrades and valances, as well as delicate turned posts. The gable ends were at one time decorated with almost Tudoresque applied Stick style woodwork, but these have apparently been sided over or removed.

The house was listed on the National Register of Historic Places on July 5, 1984.

See also
National Register of Historic Places listings in Taunton, Massachusetts

References

Houses in Taunton, Massachusetts
National Register of Historic Places in Taunton, Massachusetts
Houses on the National Register of Historic Places in Bristol County, Massachusetts
Houses completed in 1887
Queen Anne architecture in Massachusetts